is a Japanese football player, currently playing for Júbilo Iwata.

Playing career
Yamamoto was born in Fukuoka Prefecture on July 25, 1995. After graduating from Biwako Seikei Sport College, he joined J2 League club Zweigen Kanazawa in 2018.

Club statistics
Updated to 8 August 2022.

References

External links

1995 births
Living people
Biwako Seikei Sport College alumni
Association football people from Fukuoka Prefecture
Japanese footballers
J1 League players
J2 League players
Zweigen Kanazawa players
Yokohama F. Marinos players
Júbilo Iwata players
Association football defenders